Navone is an Italian surname. Notable people with it include:

 Edoardo Navone (1844–1912), Italian painter
 John Navone (1930–2016), American Jesuit priest, theologian, philosopher, educator, author, and raconteur
 Paola Navone, Italian designer